Regulations relating to the eligibility of players to play for national teams in rugby union, both in the fifteen-a-side game and rugby sevens, are the responsibility of  World Rugby, the governing body for the sport. Players' eligibility to represent a country depends on whether they have a genuine, close, credible and established national link with that country.

In principle, as soon as a player has represented a country internationally (has been "captured" by that country), they are no longer permitted to represent another country. However, a player is allowed to transfer to another country once, with approval of the World Rugby Regulations Committee, if the player is born in the country to which they wish to transfer or has a parent or grandparent who was born in that country. Playing for a second country is not permitted by means of residency. Switching countries is also possible through playing in Olympic events, provided the player has the nationality of the second country. In any case, a stand-down period of three years applies.

History

Pre-2000

World Rugby was founded, as the International Rugby Football Board (IRFB), in 1886. 

Until the 1990s, a player needed to be born in a country or have a parent or grandparent born in a country, to be eligible to play for that country's national team. Provided they met these criteria, players could play for more than one country and transfer to another country without a stand-down period.

Formally, the IRFB Regulations did not provide for eligibility based on residency, but during the 20th century there were multiple examples of players representing nations with which they had no birth or family connection. This changed in the early 1990s, when the IRFB amended its eligibility rules to specifically allow foreign players to play for a country after three years of residence. Also a stand-down period of three years was introduced for captured players (i.e., players who had represented a country at international level) seeking to represent another country.

In March 1994, the IRFB reduced the residency requirement for foreign players from three years to one year of residence.

2000 amendments: the one-country-for-life rule

Both the eligibility rules and the adoption of professionalism in 1995 increased the number of players representing nations other than their country of birth. Particularly the number of Pacific Island players representing New Zealand and Australia (either in the fifteen-a-side form of the game or in sevens) and Southern Hemisphere players playing for Northern Hemisphere nations grew significantly in the second half of the 1990s, due to a big difference in resources and professional pathways between rugby nations.

Eventually, after a review of the eligibility rules, the IRFB – on 17 January 1997 – adopted an amendment to its regulations (effective from 1 January 2000) that meant that a player could only represent one country. A player who had represented a country by playing for its national team, official second national (or "A") team or sevens team against an equivalent team from another country, would no longer be able to switch countries.

Players who played for a national team after 1 January 1997 could no longer change countries, because the stand-down period of three years would be completed after the "one-country-for-life rule" came into effect. It also resulted in unions rushing into capping dual eligible players before 1 January 2000, before the new rule would prevent them from doing so. This went as far as the Scottish Rugby Union organising a match between Scotland A and the Netherlands on 21 December 1999 for the sole purpose of capturing players Paul Johnstone (35 caps for Zimbabwe) and Alistair Murdoch (2 caps for Australia) before the new rule came into effect.

2000–2014

In this period there were several unsuccessful attempts to change the rules. 

In March 2000, an Australian proposal to abolish the grandparent rule and to extend the required residency period from three to five years failed to get support. One month later, the IRB discussed a New Zealand proposal to remove sevens teams as capturing teams.

In November 2004, the IRB rejected another proposal from New Zealand. This (amended) proposal asked to allow players who had played for Tier 1 countries to change to Tier 2 countries after a stand-down period of one year, if they satisfied the eligibility criteria for the Tier 2 country. New Zealand's original proposal was again to remove sevens from capturing players for fifteens, but it was not voted on. The IRB preferred to await the decision of the International Olympic Committee about making sevens an Olympic sport.

In December 2009, a Federation of Oceania Rugby Unions' proposal, backed by New Zealand, again asked to allow Tier 1 players to switch to Tier 2 nations after a 12-month stand-down. This proposal was met with significant resistance from particularly Ireland, Scotland and Wales and was sent back to the IRB Regulations Committee. One of the arguments raised was that it could possibly be discriminatory because it seemed to favour players of some ethnicities over others.

2014 amendments: Olympic loophole

After a failed attempt in 2005, and following  lobbying by the IRB, rugby sevens was added to the Olympic Programme for the 2016 and 2020 Summer Olympics on 9 October 2009. 

In 2014, the IRB amended its regulations. A requirement for players to be a national of the country they represent at the Olympic Games was introduced, in addition to the existing eligibility criteria of having a genuine, close, credible and established national link with that country. Captured players were allowed to change to another country of which they had the nationality after a stand-down period of three years, which was reduced to 18 months for the 2016 Olympic Sevens. 

Initially, players who represented a new country at one sevens tournament regarded as an Olympic event, could represent that country in any other form of the game. While the IRB's Regulations Committee would consider every application for transfer to another country and check whether the reasons for the application were "bona fide sevens reasons", the IRB decided to tighten its regulations to prevent abuse that went against the spirit of the regulation. On 18 September 2014, the IRB ruled that a player had to play in at least four Olympic events to complete their transfer to another country.

2017 amendments: extension of the residency requirement period

From 2016, the residency period was back on the agenda of World Rugby (as the IRB was called since 19 November 2014). The main driver behind this was the vice-chairman Agustín Pichot. Pichot was determined to put an end to the player drain from smaller nations – such as the Pacific Island nations – and the phenomenon of so-called project players.

On 10 May 2017, World Rugby adopted the following changes to the eligibility rules in Regulation 8:

 the residency requirement was increased from 36 to 60 consecutive months (effective from 31 December 2020);
 a new eligibility criteria was introduced: players with 10 years of cumulative residency in a country could also become eligible to play for that country (effective 10 May 2017);
 national U20s teams could no longer be nominated by national unions as their next senior national representative team (effective 1 January 2018);
 two different age criteria applied for sevens players: they would be captured by a union if they had reached the age of majority if they played for the national representative sevens team of that union in the Olympic Games or Rugby World Cup Sevens; in all other tournaments or events they would be captured if they had reached the age of 20 on or before the date of participation (effective 1 July 2017).

On 10 August 2020, World Rugby decided to retain the 36-month residency requirement for one more year, to 31 December 2021. World Rugby considered that, due to the COVID-19 pandemic, there were too limited playing opportunities for players to meet the residency requirement and have represented their union before the end of the year 2020.

Subsequently, the Scottish Rugby Union announced that it had hired a team of scouts ("Scottish Qualified representatives") that would start a world-wide search for players with Scottish ancestry, who would be eligible to play for Scotland, despite not being born there.

2021 amendments: exception to the one-country-for-life rule

More than twenty years after the one-country-for-life rule came into effect, and several failed attempts to change this rule later, World Rugby voted to amend the rule – with the narrowest of margins – on 24 November 2021. From 1 January 2022, a player who has been captured by playing for a country in either XVs or sevens can change to a new country once, provided they or their (grand)parents were born in the new country. A stand-down period of three years applies and a transfer is subject to approval by the World Rugby Regulations Committee.

This eligibility rule change, which was reportedly passed by a vote of 39 in favour, 11 against, and 1 abstention (39 votes were needed for the required 75% majority) is expected to mostly benefit the Pacific Island nations and a few (other) tier 2 or 3 nations.

Another amendment to the eligibility rules adopted on 24 November 2021 aims to align the "age of majority" across XVs and sevens rugby. Under the amended rule, all players will be captured by playing for a national representative team at the age of 18 years.

Current eligibility rules

This section describes the current eligibility rules, of which some will be further clarified by means of the Explanatory Guidelines on the Implementation of Regulation 8: Eligibility to play for National Representative teams (abbr.: ENRT Guideline) and Olympic Eligibility (abbr.: OE Guideline).

Primary eligibility criteria

The main eligibility rule for rugby union is laid down in Regulation 8.1 and reads as follows:

National link established by birth

The term "parent" refers to a player's blood parent or a parent who has formally adopted the player in line with the applicable legal requirements of the country concerned. Grandparent is the parent's blood parent or their legal adoptive parent. In case of legal adoption of the player, the birthplace of the blood parent is no longer relevant for determining the player's eligibility; similarly, in case of legal adoption of a parent of the player, the country of birth of that parent's blood parent will not be taken into account. The birthplace of stepparents or foster parents will never be considered (ENRT Guideline 13).

In most cases, it will be clear in which country's geographical borders someone is born, but in cases where it's not (e.g., a player being born in a military hospital or in an enclave), the matter should be referred to the World Rugby Regulations Committee for a ruling (ENRT Guideline 12).

Despite the apparent ease with which a player's – or their (grand)parent's – birthplace can normally be determined, it was the grandparent rule that gave rise to the biggest eligibility scandal to date. In the so-called Grannygate saga, Wales and Scotland were found to have fielded players of whom they had incorrectly assumed that they were eligible, without any satisfactory evidence of these players' grandparents being born in Wales/Scotland. The embarrassment caused by the scandal was bigger than the official punishment.  On 3 May 2000, the independent judicial panel that was convened by the IRFB to investigate the matter only reprimanded the Welsh and Scottish national unions and ordered them to pay the costs of the hearing. The panel stated not to have jurisdiction to take action against union officials and the players concerned, and didn't impose any sanction against them. However, the players were barred from playing for these nations until they had completed the 3-year residency period.

National link established by residence
Residence

"Residence" in terms of Regulation 8 is the place where the player has their "primary and permanent home". Factors that will be taken into account include, among others, the actual time spent in a country and the purpose of any absences during the qualification period (ENRT Guideline 14). A player who has moved from one country to another will need to be able to provide clear proof that they are no longer resident in the country where they moved from and that that country is no longer their home (ENRT Guideline 15).

A player can go on holiday, visit family and friends, attend weddings or funerals in other countries without interrupting their period of residence. World Rugby uses the guideline that a player – exceptional circumstances excluded – has to be physically present in a country for at least 10 months throughout any qualifying year of the residency period to be able to show that that country is their primary and permanent home (ENRT Guideline 16).

Students

In the majority of cases, a full-time international student's permanent and primary  home is expected to be their parental home and time spent in another country will likely be seen as temporary absences from that home, especially if the student is not financially independent. However, the overriding factor in determining a student's eligibility remains whether there is a credible and established link with the country concerned (ENRT Guideline 19).

Students, particularly students who have reached the age of majority, can begin a new residency period in the country in which they are studying, if they have moved there permanently and only have taken short breaks away from the new country (in accordance with ENRT Guideline 16). With regard to the residency period of students, Unions and players are advised to ask for a ruling of the Regulations Committee about the player's eligibility. It is also explicitly stated that Unions and educational institutions are not allowed to offer scholarships and other benefits that restrict a player's choice of which Union they wish to represent (ENRT Guideline 19).

Example

Sitiveni Sivivatu is an example of a player who was prevented from playing for New Zealand in 2004, because – according to the then current interpretation from the IRB – his time spent at Wesley College (South Auckland, New Zealand) in 2000 and 2001 did not count towards the 36-month residency requirement. Attending school or university in another country was seen by the IRB as temporary absence from a player's permanent home, without taking into account the player's age; Sivivatu was 18 years old when he moved to New Zealand in 2000.

Nationality

Players who would like to participate in the Olympic Games, or in Olympic (qualifying) events, must meet the criteria in Regulation 8.1 to 8.4 as well as hold the nationality of the country of the National Olympic Committee which they are representing in such Olympic Events. The nationality requirement was introduced to comply with the eligibility rules in the Olympic Charter. (Regulation 8.9)

Combined teams

Sometimes, a member Union of World Rugby doesn't have an equivalent National Olympic Committee; in such cases, there may be a combined NOC for more than one Union. An example is Team GB (England, Scotland, Wales and Northern Ireland, represented by the all-Ireland body of the Irish Rugby Football Union). Players who are eligible to play for an individual Union that is part of a combined NOC are also eligible to play for the Olympic Sevens Team of that NOC in Olympic Events, e.g. Great Britain 7s (OE Guideline 12).

Exception to the eligibility rule: captured players

The main exception to the eligibility rule in Regulation 8.1 can be found in Regulation 8.2, which defines the "one-country-for-life rule":

Capturing representative teams

In the usual form of rugby union (XVs), the capturing teams are a Union's fifteen-a-side national representative team and next senior fifteen-a-side national representative team.

Players can be captured in matches against the senior or next senior national representative team of another Union; against senior or next senior (visiting) touring squads during an international tour approved by World Rugby; or in matches for a Union's (travelling) senior or next-senior touring squad during a World Rugby approved international tour. Regulation 8.3 sets out further criteria, one of them being that a player must be present at a match either as a replacement, substitute or playing member to be captured (Reg. 8.3 and ENRT Guideline 5).

In the sevens variant, a player is captured if they are named in a Union's senior national representative sevens team for an international match against the senior national representative sevens team of another Union, and is present at the match either as a replacement, substitute or playing member. A player can also be captured if they are named in a Union's senior national representative sevens team for the Olympic Games or the Rugby World Cup Sevens, and – again – is present at such tournament either as a replacement, substitute or playing member (Reg. 8.4 and ENRT Guideline 5).

In order to be captured, a player must have reached the age of majority on or before the date of participation in an international match (ENRT Guideline 5). ENRT Guideline 7 states that, for the purpose of the World Rugby Regulations, "the age of majority is deemed to be acquired on a Player's 18th birthday."

National Under 20 teams are not capturing national representative teams in terms of regulation 8, and can – since 1 January 2018 – also no longer be designated as a Union's "next senior fifteen-a-side National Representative Team".

Examples

The question whether a player had been captured under regulation 8 has given rise to many rulings of the IRB/World Rugby.

One example is the case of Jason Jones-Hughes. When Australian born Jones-Hughes, whose father was born in Wales, was named in the Wales squad for the 1999 Rugby World Cup, Rugby Australia lodged a complaint with the IRB. The Australians claimed he was ineligible to play for Wales because he had played for the Australian Barbarians against Scotland in 1998, which they said was Australia's next senior representative team. In first instance, the IRB ruled in Australia's favour, but Jones-Hughes appealed the decision and the IRB's executive committee sided with Jones-Hughes. According to the committee, there were two players playing for the Barbarians against Scotland, who were not eligible to play for Australia. In that game, the Barbarians therefore did not meet the criteria of a national representative team.

Another case is that of Steven Shingler. Shingler was named in the Scotland squad for the 2012 Six Nations. Wales submitted an objection to the IRB, because he had played for the Wales Under 20 team in 2011. The IRB Regulations Committee upheld the objection, stating that Shingler was captured by Wales because – at the time – both Wales Under-20 and the opposition team (France Under-20 team) were the respective Unions' designated next senior fifteen-a-side national representative team. The Scottish Rugby Union appealed the decision, but the IRB Council dismissed the appeal.

A final example with far-reaching consequences relates to matches played by Romania, Spain and Belgium during the European qualification for the 2019 Rugby World Cup. The three countries were docked points by an Independent Disputes Committee set up by World Rugby for fielding ineligible players. Romania was penalised for fielding Sione Fakaʻosilea in eight matches, including six World Cup qualifiers, despite Faka'osilea having already played for the Tonga Sevens team during the 2013 Gold Coast Sevens. As a result of the points deduction, Romania lost its World Cup spot in pool A to Russia (initially third on the qualification table). Spain was penalised because two ineligible players – who had previously played for the France Under-20 team – had played for Spain in a total of nine test matches, of which eight World Cup qualification matches. This resulted in Spain losing its World Cup qualification play-off spot to Germany (initially fifth and last on the qualification table). Belgium was found to have played five ineligible players in a total of six qualification matches. These players were ineligible because they, nor their (grand)parents were born in Belgium (they didn't claim eligibility under the residency rule). Appeals by Romania and Spain against these decisions were dismissed by an Independent Appeal Committee convened by World Rugby.

Multi-country teams: Pacific Islanders team

In 2003, the IRB agreed to a request from the Pacific Islands Rugby Alliance for an international tour of a combined Pacific Islanders team. Between 2004 and 2006, the Pacific Islanders team played 11 matches, of which 9 tests against the national representative teams of Australia, New Zealand, Ireland, Scotland, Wales, England, France and Italy.

Clarifying the eligibility rules applicable to the Pacific Islanders' test matches, the IRB ruled in May 2004 that playing for the Pacific Islanders team would not capture an uncapped player's eligibility. So a player who hadn't played international rugby yet and was eligible to play for one or more of the Pacific Island nations and/or a third country (e.g. New Zealand, Australia), would not be captured by any of these nations by playing for the Pacific Islanders team.

Exceptions to the one-country-for-life rule

Regulations 8.6 and 8.7 describe which criteria must be met in order to be exempted from the one-country-for-life rule in Regulation 8.2:

Regulations 8.6-8.8 make clear that a player can switch countries only once and only if their eligibility for the second country is based on the player or their (grand)parent being born in the second country. Eligibility for the second country cannot be established through residency. In case of Olympic transfer, the player must also have the nationality of the second country.

In all cases, there is a stand-down period of three years between the last game the player played for the senior, next senior or senior sevens national representative team of their original Union and the time the player first represents the second Union in a match, tournament or series of matches (ENRT Guideline 4.5). The stand-down period may in certain circumstances be reduced or cancelled for Olympic transfers.

For birthright transfer, approval of the World Rugby Regulations Committee must be obtained. Applications to World Rugby cannot be considered before all criteria for transfer have been met (ENRT Guideline 4.3). For Olympic transfer, also the approval of the International Olympic Committee and the relevant National Olympic Committees must be obtained.

See also

 Giteau's law
 Grandfather rule
 Grannygate
 IRL eligibility rules - comparable rules for rugby league
 Laws of rugby union
 List of rugby union players who have represented more than one nation
 Pacific Islanders rugby union team
 Professionalism
 World Rugby

References

Rugby union
World Rugby
History of rugby union